Laulu laakson kukista (Song of the Flowers of the Valley) is the second studio album by the Finnish psychedelic folk band Paavoharju.

Track listing

References

2008 albums
Paavoharju albums